Qiu Ying is a crater on Mercury. Its name was adopted by the International Astronomical Union in 2012, for the Chinese painter Qiu Ying.

References

Impact craters on Mercury